The R17 is a line of Rodalies de Catalunya's regional rail service, operated by Renfe Operadora. It runs southwards from the Barcelona area to Port Aventura, near the seaside resort of Salou, passing through the Vallès Occidental, Baix Llobregat, Garraf, Baix Penedès, Camp de Tarragona, Baix Ebre and Montsià  regions.

R17 trains started operating on  after the closure of a segment of the Valencia−Sant Vicenç de Calders railway and the opening of an alternative route bypassing that segment, affecting trains running through that segment. The newly created R17 took over the former segment of line R16 between Tarragona and Port Aventura stations, where the old line stops operating.

List of stations
The following table lists the name of each station served by line R17 in order from south to north; the station's service pattern offered by R17 trains; the transfers to other Rodalies de Catalunya lines, including both commuter and regional rail services; remarkable transfers to other transport systems; the municipality in which each station is located; and the fare zone each station belongs to according to the Autoritat del Transport Metropolità (ATM Àrea de Barcelona) fare-integrated public transport system and Rodalies de Catalunya's own fare zone system for Barcelona commuter rail service lines.

References

External links
 Rodalies de Catalunya official website
 Schedule for the R17 (PDF format)
 Official Twitter accounts by Rodalies de Catalunya for lines R17 with service status updates (tweets usually published only in Catalan)
 R17 (rodalia 17) on Twitter. Unofficial Twitter account by Rodalia.info monitoring real-time information about the R17 by its users.
 Information about the R17 at trenscat.cat 

17
Railway services introduced in 2020